The Ilyas Shahi dynasty was the first independent dynasty to set the foundations of the late medieval Sunni Muslim Sultanate of Bengal. Hailing from the Sistan region in Iran, their rule extended from 1342 to 1487, though interrupted with an interregna by their slaves as well as the House of Ganesha.

Initial dynasty

Ilyas Shah, the founder of the dynasty, who were of Turkic origin.The ancestors of Ilyas Shah originated from Sistan, and according to Syed A M R Haque, arrived to the subcontinent as Muslim missionaries and the family were granted jagirs in Bengal in the year 1227. Bengal was under the Delhi Sultanate at the time.

During the governorship of Izz al-Din Yahya in Satgaon, Shamsuddin Ilyas Shah took service under him. Following Yahya's death in 1338, Ilyas Shah took control of Satgaon and declared himself as a Sultan, independent of Delhi. He then waged a campaign, defeating both the Sultans Alauddin Ali Shah and Ikhtiyaruddin Ghazi Shah of Lakhnauti and Sonargaon respectively by 1342. This led to the foundation of Bengal as single political entity and the start of the Bengal Sultanate and its first dynasty, the Ilyas Shahi.

After Shamsuddin's death, his son Sikandar Shah ascended the throne. Sikandar ruled for the next 30 years and built the Adina Masjid in Pandua in 1368 and Kotwali Darwaza in Gauḍa. Ghiyasuddin Azam Shah, son of Sikandar Shah succeeded the throne and established friendly relationships with the Ming Empire of China and encouraged trade. During his reign, Ma Huan, a Chinese traveller visited Bengal.

Instability
In 1415, political confusion and weakness of the Ilyas Shahi dynasty led to Saifuddin Hamza Shah's rule being overthrown by slave Shihabuddin Bayazid Shah's family and the House of Ganesha shortly after. Ganesha's son Jadu embraced Islam and assumed the title of Jalal ad-Din Muhammad Shah. He was succeeded by his son, Shams ad-Din Ahmad Shah. Ahmad was killed by his nobles in 1436 in an attempt to restore the Ilyas Shahi dynasty.

Restored dynasty
After the death of Shams ad-Din Ahmad, the rule of the Ilyas Shahi dynasty was restored by Mahmud Shah, a descendant of Shamsuddin Ilyas Shah, who ascended the throne in 1437 as Nasiruddin Mahmud Shah I. In 1487, the last ruler of this dynasty Jalal ad-Din Fatih Shah was killed by his Habshi commander of the palace guards, Shahzada Barbak, who ascended the throne under the title, Sultan Barbak Shah. With this, the Ilyas Shahi dynasty's rule over Bengal came to an end. The current

List of rulers

Silver shaded row signifies the start of the Restored Ilyas Shahi dynasty.

See also

 History of Bengal
 History of India
 History of Bangladesh
 List of Sunni Muslim dynasties

References

External links
 
 The Iliyas Shahi Dynasty

 
Dynasties of Bengal
Empires and kingdoms of India
Medieval India
Dynasties of India
States and territories established in the 14th century
Sunni dynasties